Rosedale Township is one of eleven townships in Jersey County, Illinois, United States.  As of the 2010 census, its population was 456 and it contained 295 housing units.

History
The name of Rosedale Township was changed from Illinois Township on June 7, 1882.

Geography

Unincorporated towns
Nutwood
Rosedale

Adjacent townships
 Richwood Township (north)
 English Township (northeast)
 Otter Creek Township (east)
 Quarry Township (southeast)

Cemeteries
The township contains two active cemeteries, Meadow Branch and Rosedale, as well as several that are inactive.

Major highways
  Illinois Route 100

Rivers
 Illinois River

Lakes
 Beaver Lake
 Deep Lake
 Eagle Lake
 Flat Lake
 Fowler Lake
 Upper Flat Lake

Landmarks
 Pere Marquette State Park

Demographics

School districts
 Jersey Community Unit School District 100

Political districts
 Illinois' 17th congressional district
 State House District 97
 State Senate District 49

Notes

References
 
 United States Census Bureau 2007 TIGER/Line Shapefiles
 United States National Atlas

External links
 City-Data.com
 Illinois State Archives

Townships in Jersey County, Illinois
Townships in Illinois